is a Japanese manga series written and illustrated by Akira Hiramoto about the blues legend Robert Johnson. It was originally serialized in Kodansha's Monthly Afternoon and later in Young Magazine the 3rd. The manga was licensed in North America by Del Rey Manga and in France by Kana.

School Library Journal named Me and the Devil Blues as one of the best adult books for high school students in 2008. Me and the Devil Blues won the 2009 Glyph Comics Awards in the Best Reprint Publication category.

Publication
The manga takes its name from the title of the Robert Johnson song, "Me and the Devil Blues". It is written and illustrated by Akira Hiramoto. It was published in Kodansha's Monthly Afternoon and was put on indefinite hiatus in 2008. The manga was transferred to Young Magazine the 3rd Magazine in 2014. The series' latest chapter in the magazine was published in March 2017. Young Magazine the 3rd Magazine'''s last issue was released in April 2021. Kodansha has published the first five volumes between January 21, 2005, and July 6, 2015.

In North America, Del Rey Manga released the first four volumes in a two-volumes-in-one format. The first volume (containing volumes 1 and 2 of the Japanese editions) was published on July 29, 2008 and the second volume (containing volumes 2 and 4 of the Japanese editions) was published on December 30, 2008. The manga is licensed in France by Kana.

Volume list

Chapters not yet in tankōbon format
35. "From Four Until Late ③"
36. "From Four Until Late ④"
37. "From Four Until Late ⑤"
38. "From Four Until Late ⑥"

ReceptionSchool Library Journal named Me and the Devil Blues as one of the best adult books for high school students in 2008. The 2009 Glyph Comics Awards was awarded to Me and the Devil Blues for the Best Reprint Publication. About.com's Deb Aoki lists Me and the Devil Blues as the best "underappreciated gem" of 2008 along with Shoulder-A-Coffin Kuro.

Anime News Network's Casey Brienza commends the manga for its "superb, historically accurate artwork and an intriguing, original story premise" but criticises the manga for its "painfully slow narrative pacing, silly plot points, and a whiff of unintentional bigotry".
About.com's Deb Aoki criticises the manga for its "lots of strong language, sex and graphic violence [which] makes this mostly an adult pleasure". Mania.com's Nadia Oxford commends the manga for its "surreal mix of fantasy and reality" that portray what could have happened to Robert Johnson. Comic Book Bin's Leroy Douresseaux commends the manga for its "stunning visuals, which Hiramoto composes using a variety of styles, techniques, and media". Peter Gutiérrez from Graphic Novel Reporter comments on the manga's use of its "Faustian premise to work squarely in the Southern Gothic mode of the horror genre, Hiramoto then shifts the tempo and tone quite radically". John Thomas from Comics Village commends Hiramoto for "his valiant attempt to bring a long-gone Southern bluesman's story to a modern Japanese audience". Jason Thompson, in the online appendix to Manga: The Complete Guide'', wrote "The passive protagonist and depressing narrative, coupled with a weak non-ending ... , make for a disappointing narrative, although the art is chilling and lovely and it has many fine page-turner sequences."

References

External links
 

2003 manga
Comics set in the 1930s
Comics set in the United States
Comics based on real people
Cultural depictions of Robert Johnson
Del Rey Manga
Historical anime and manga
Kodansha manga
Music in anime and manga
Psychological horror anime and manga
Seinen manga
Supernatural anime and manga